Tsuga ulleungensis, also known as the Ulleungdo hemlock, is a conifer species discovered on Ulleungdo island, Korea, and formally classified in 2017.

References

ulleungensis